The British School of Nanjing is a British Curriculum international school in Jiangning District, Nanjing, for children aged 2 to 18 years (Pre-Nursery to Year 13). It is a part of Nord Anglia Education.

Governance 

The school is wholly foreign owned and managed. Daily operations are managed by the Headteacher.

BSN is part of Nord Anglia Education, a major provider of international schools. The school is fully registered with the Ministry of Education in China and is also an associate member of the East Asian Association of British International Schools (EAABIS), the Council of British International Schools (COBIS), and is registered with the Qualifications and Curriculum Authority in the UK (ISN: 1880018).

Curriculum and learning 
The school follows the British National Curriculum, which is one of three main internationally recognized curricula.

References

External links 
 
 

Schools in Nanjing
High schools in Nanjing
British international schools in China
International schools in Jiangsu
Nord Anglia Education